The Digi-Comp II was a toy computer invented by John "Jack" Thomas Godfrey (1924–2009) in 1965 and manufactured by E.S.R., Inc. in the late 1960s that used  marbles rolling down a ramp to perform basic calculations.  A two-level masonite platform with blue plastic guides served as the medium for a supply of marbles that rolled down an inclined plane moving plastic cams as they went.  The red plastic cams played the part of flip-flops in an electronic computer - as a marble passed one of the cams, it would flip the cam around - in one position, the cam would allow the marble to pass in one direction, in the other position, it would cause the marble to drop through a hole and roll to the bottom of the ramp. The Digi-Comp II platform measures .

The Digi-Comp II was not programmable, unlike the Digi-Comp I, an earlier offering in the E.S.R. product line that used an assortment of plastic slides, tubes, and bent metal wires to solve simple logic problems.

Computational power 
Computer scientist Scott Aaronson analyzed the computational power of the Digi-Comp II. There are several ways to mathematically model the device's computational capabilities. A natural abstraction is a directed acyclic graph in which each internal vertex has an out-degree of 2, representing a toggle cam that routes balls to one of two other vertices. A fixed number of balls are placed at a designated source vertex, and the decision problem is to determine whether any balls ever reach a designated sink vertex. Aaronson showed that this decision problem, given as inputs a description of the DAG and the number of balls to run (encoded in unary), is complete under log-space reduction for CC, the class of problems log-space reducible to the stable marriage problem. He also showed that the variant of the problem in which the number of balls is encoded in binary, allowing the machine to run for an exponentially longer time, is still in P.

Reproductions 

A slightly downscaled reproduction of the Digi-Comp II, made from plywood, is available from Evil Mad Scientist since 2011. This reproduction uses  steel pachinko balls, and measures .

The Massachusetts Institute of Technology's Stata Center houses one copy of the giant version.

See also 
 Geniac
 Dr. Nim - a Nim-playing game, based on the Digi-Comp II mechanism
 Turing Tumble
 WDR paper computer
 CARDboard Illustrative Aid to Computation

References

External links
 The Old Computer Museum - Collection of old analog, digital and mechanical computers.
 System Source Computer Museum, providing a web simulator
 Extra-large recreation, video showing the multiplication of 13 × 3 on a scaled-up re-creation.
 Original Instruction Manual
 Digi-Comp II Replica - Instructions and files for creating your own Digi-Comp II

Mechanical computers
Educational toys